Cuito Cuanavale is a town and municipality in Cuando Cubango (Kuando-Kubango) province in Angola. The names Kuito Kuanavale or Kwito Kwanavale are sometimes used, although this is a mutation of the original Portuguese name.

Cuito Cuanavale is bordered to the north by the municipality of Luchazes, to the east by the municipality of Mavinga, to the south by the municipality of Nancova, and to the west by the municipalities of Menongue and Chitembo

The area around the town was the scene of heavy fighting during various campaigns during the Angolan Civil War and the South African Border War, with the Battle of Cuito Cuanavale from 1987-1988 being the largest land battle in Africa since World War II. The town is served by Cuito Cuanavale Airport.

History
The town owes its name to two local rivers: the Cuito and the Cuanavale. The city day is celebrated on October 21, with an annual celebration being organized for the occasion.

Battle of Cuito Cuanavale

It was in this municipality that some of the bloodiest clashes of the Angolan Civil War took place. On the one hand, the FAPLA, the armed forces of the MPLA, at the height of power fought, supported by the Cuban army, and on the other, the FALA, armed forces of UNITA, supported by the South African Army. Thousands of combatants died on both sides. At the end of the battle of Cuito Cuanavale, both UNITA and the MPLA declared themselves victorious. The biggest consequence of this conflict was the withdrawal of Cuban and South African forces from Angolan territory, and the consequent independence of Namibia.

See also
 Battle of Cuito Cuanavale
 Operation Alpha Centauri

References

Populated places in Cuando Cubango Province
Municipalities of Angola
Battle of Cuito Cuanavale